Yale is an unincorporated community in rural Sussex County, Virginia, United States. Its ZIP code is 23897.

Hunting Quarter Plantation
The historic Hunting Quarter plantation, is located near Yale. Hunting Quarter, was built after 1745 by Captain Henry Harrison who fought in the French and Indian War. Captain Harrison was a brother of Benjamin Harrison V, the signer of the Declaration of Independence, and uncle of President William Henry Harrison (1774-1841). "Hunting Quarter" remained in the possession of the Harrison family until 1887. Hunting Quarter is listed on the National Register of Historic Places.

Notes

Unincorporated communities in Sussex County, Virginia
Unincorporated communities in Virginia